Fishing and Hunting Club was a short lived DuMont Television Network program aired on Fridays at 9 pm ET from October 7, 1949, to March 31, 1950. At one point the name of the show changed to Sports for All. The 30-minute program was hosted by Bill Slater. In the program, panelists answered questions about fishing and hunting.

Episode status
Only one or two episodes are held in the J. Fred MacDonald collection at the Library of Congress.

See also
List of programs broadcast by the DuMont Television Network
List of surviving DuMont Television Network broadcasts
1949-50 United States network television schedule

Bibliography
David Weinstein, The Forgotten Network: DuMont and the Birth of American Television (Philadelphia: Temple University Press, 2004) 
Alex McNeil, Total Television, Fourth edition (New York: Penguin Books, 1980) 
Tim Brooks and Earle Marsh, The Complete Directory to Prime Time Network TV Shows, Third edition (New York: Ballantine Books, 1964)

External links
Fishing and Hunting Club at IMDB
DuMont historical website

1949 American television series debuts
1950 American television series endings
Black-and-white American television shows
DuMont Television Network original programming
DuMont sports programming